Chris Hulls is an American entrepreneur and business executive, best known for being the founder of the family networking app Life360.

Life and education

Hulls lives in Point Reyes, California.  Hulls attended Tomales High School where he graduated a year early, subsequently taking classes at the College of Marin.

Hulls joined the United States Air Force and served out of Qatar. Hulls later left the military and enrolled at the University of California, Berkeley, serving an internship with Goldman Sachs. After turning down an offer to work full-time, he enrolled in Harvard Business School.

Career

Hulls left Harvard to launch Life360, a mobile family networking application that allows families to see each other's locations through password protected networks. He came up with the idea during his time as an undergraduate. After seeing the United States Government's Ready.gov initiative that allowed people to find family members in a disaster, Hulls decided to create an easier platform for mobile users. Ready.gov used a system of pre-printed forms that families could print and fill out with a pen, while Hulls decided to make the app a location-based service that worked in real time. Hulls entered the Life360 app into the Android Developer Challenge and won over 3,000 other entries. He received a $275,000 award that he used to pay back prior investments from friends and family as well as hire developers for the app.

Outside of Life360, Hulls has been involved in public speaking and been quoted in numerous publications on various topics.

References

External links
 Official Twitter profile
 AppStoreOptimization.com website

Living people
Place of birth missing (living people)
University of California, Berkeley alumni
Businesspeople from California
Year of birth missing (living people)
Harvard Business School alumni
People from Point Reyes, California